Charles Sitzenstuhl (born 3 December 1988) is a French politician of Agir who has been member of the National Assembly for Bas-Rhin's 5th constituency since 2022.

References

See also 

 List of deputies of the 16th National Assembly of France

1988 births
Living people
Deputies of the 16th National Assembly of the French Fifth Republic
La République En Marche! politicians
Agir (France) politicians
21st-century French politicians
Members of Parliament for Bas-Rhin

University of Strasbourg alumni
Sciences Po alumni
People from Sélestat